Capes, Cowls and Villains Foul is a pen and paper roleplaying game about comic book style superheroes and their adventures, developed and published by Parsons, Kansas-based Spectrum Games. It officially debuted in the form of an illustrated 13-page PDF document released for free, called the Quickstart Preview in 2010. A full rulebook was released in 2012. It was written by Barak Blackburn, and uses a significantly modified version of a rules system that was first introduced in Cartoon Action Hour: Season 2 in late 2008.

Capes, Cowls and Villains Foul, abbreviated as CC&VF or CCVF, adapts the narrative and open-ended trait system of Cartoon Action Hour: Season 2 to the genre of superhero comics, and aims to make each roleplaying game session feel as much as possible like writing and editing a comicbook. Conceptually, it operates on the edge of the narrative school of game design, aiming to make characters and their abilities as flexible as possible while still maintaining its own system and dice roll mechanics. It is arguably among the most versatile superhero games that do not completely forgo the elements of dice, tables, or numbers. Tim Kirk's Hearts & Souls and Chad Underkoffler's Truth & Justice, both written for the same genre, share similar goals and design features, but are unrelated publications that came out about five years before CC&VF.

While Cartoon Action Hour and CC&VF are closely related systems, both are de facto independent rules frameworks, and the texts in either are written from scratch to reflect the chosen genre, and the “parent medium” emulated (animated cartoon shows for CAH, printed comicbooks for CC&VF). For CC&VF, the popular references to cartoon series, action figures and pop culture of the 1980s were cut in favor of terms and references taken only from the printed comic book medium.

Unlike other games by Spectrum Games, CC&VF does not use a default time period, location, or style of superhero stories, but the majority of its illustrations and a few hints and allusions in the flavor text suggest a tribute to superhero comics of the early to late Silver Age, and maybe the Bronze Age. The author himself has mentioned on forums and blog entries that he is a big fan of Marvel comicbooks of the 1970s.

History of the game 

In late 2009, Cynthia Celeste Miller, who founded and runs Spectrum Games, was approached by Barak Blackburn, a long-time friend and fellow gamer, with the idea of publishing a superhero-themed version of the Cartoon Action Hour game. Blackburn had played and studied most of the earlier and contemporary roleplaying game systems published for the superhero genre, and found them either too restrictive or too rules-heavy, especially in character creation. Since the second edition of Cartoon Action Hour, published a little over a year earlier, was seen as too intimately tied to the 1980s toy-driven cartoon series like Masters of the Universe, Transformers, and G.I. Joe to match the concept, Miller and Blackburn quickly decided that their superhero book would be developed from the ground up as a new core system book rather than a supplement. Blackburn also wanted to mostly streamline and unify the crunchier aspects of character design from CAH: Season 2, such as the representation of companions, vehicles, gear, or magic spells.

Cartoon Action Hour had always had the potential to accommodate lower- to mid-powered superhero characters or superhero parodies, and was already being used by some GMs for that purpose, but Spectrum Games made clear that the new project would be geared towards emulating the printed comicbooks, not animation or live-action television. This in fact took Miller's design back to its roots, because an early version of what would become the Cartoon Action Hour “first edition” rules appeared in 2001, in a free rules booklet in PDF form, under the name of “Four Colors,” or “4C” for short. 4C was always meant to be a short beginner-friendly rulebook for superhero adventuring set in the world of the 1930s and 40s, a.k.a. the Golden Age of superhero stories.

4C had introduced the d12 roll+modifier mechanic against a difficulty level (rolling high is good), as well as the concept of average human traits being given a value of zero, and no need to list or describe a trait that a character was average in. Just as in all editions of Cartoon Action Hour, as well as the related games Midway City and Tomorrow Knights, a rating of zero in a trait did not cost any points in character creation. A rating of 4 was defined as “world-class” and marked the maximum possible for non-superpowered, mortal humans.

While the superpowers creation system in 4C was not completely freestyle or open-ended, it already waived the idea of a list or chapter specifically for powers and abilities, and instead was built on the idea that as a player, “you define every aspect of the power yourself” (4C Player Guide, pg. 4). Secondly, it introduced the concept of Oomph and Stunt Points, a currency of hero points that could significantly modify die rolls to give player-characters an edge. Those points became unified as “Oomph” in CAH: Season 2, and appear in CC&VF, re-christened “Editorial Control” or simply “EC.” Thirdly, the traditional distinction between raw attributes and skills was dropped.

Lastly, 4C'''s legacy can be seen in the fact that the game uses the 12-sided die as its only die type, and rolling 1 is always a failure, while rolling 12 is always seen as a special, spectacular result (though never an automatic success).

The name “Capes, Cowls and Villains Foul” also came with its share of history: According to the Designer's Notes section in Cartoon Action Hour's first book edition (2003), the title had been used half-jokingly by Cynthia Celeste Miller for a small superhero system that she had written as a project for Zan's Super Home website. That was a very condensed, non-illustrated game in blog or column format. Nothing was ever said about any plans to publish this as a commercial product, but it formed the prototype of what became the “Four Colors” rulebook (CAH, 2003 edition, pg. 107). Most of the rules developed under the name CC&VF soon resurfaced in CAH proper in 2002 and 2003, so that name is almost as old as the “Cartoon Action Hour” brand-name. When it was conveyed to the new project in 2010, the name was effectively re-activated rather than devised anew.

Spectrum Games released the full rulebook for the game on the night of 4 August 2012, as a PDF, with the softcover printed book available a few weeks after. The book so far is a print on demand product, outside of mainstream book distribution.

 The Omlevex connection 

Until late August 2010, the working title for the game “Capes, Cowls and Villains Foul” was still “Omlevex.” The reason for that was that Cynthia Celeste Miller had originally intended her company's new superhero rulebook to feature the characters and campaign world from her own creation, the Omlevex universe, which had previously been published in 2004 as a setting supplement with game stats for three of the most widely known superhero RPGs at that time: (Mutants & Masterminds 1st edition, Hero System 5th edition, and Silver Age Sentinels Tri-Stat d10 edition). The word “Omlevex” denotes both a fictitious mineral found in that game world, and the name of a fictitious 1960s “Silver Age” comic book publishing company. Since the Omlevex supplement had been out of print for several years by 2010, and the rights to the property had reverted to Spectrum Games, the original plan was effectively to reactivate the Omlevex campaign world, possibly to update it to the 2010s, and give it its own independent rules system. However, the updating of the Omlevex universe had not progressed significantly by mid-2010, and the playtesters of the new system were using their own superhero characters, or heroes borrowed from popular Marvel and DC titles.

After returning from GenCon 2010, where she had attended a game designer seminar, Miller came to the conclusion that a new superhero RPG would have a better chance to win fans and critical approval if it did not include a prefabricated game world to play in. Since most of the other games of the genre usually came with a similar default superhero setting, and most players interested in the genre were highly likely to want to create their own versions of a Marvel- and DC-inspired universe, all references to the Omlevex property were soon dropped. Rather, Spectrum Games put its focus on completing the rules design. This also meant that "Omlevex" would no longer work as the name of the system. By September 2010, CC&VF had been established as the new name for the superhero product line, and a logo for this title was designed by Miller. Omlevex, on the other hand, is not dead, and is currently scheduled to be published as one of several optional campaign supplements for CC&VF, probably in 2013.

In short, “Capes, Cowls and Villains Foul” is now a game title, while “Omlevex” is only the name of a setting.

 The system 

 The basics Capes, Cowls and Villains Foul shares the d12 roll-high mechanic from its predecessors, chiefly Cartoon Action Hour: Season 2, and a very similar approach to what a game stat is, and how each player can assume narrative control and take liberties by interpreting and re-interpreting any and all of their character's stats. The dividing line between the roles of the Game Master (called “Editor” here) and the players is thus not as definitive as in other roleplaying games.

All rolls in the game are done by using 12-sided dice, and adding or subtracting a modifier (adding being far more common). Human-level abilities and skills add 1 to 4 to a die roll result, while superhuman abilities can add anything from 5 up, with modifiers adding more than 12 through a single ability being somewhat rare, but not unheard of for superheroes. To use an ability against a foe or other opposing force, you have to simply meet or beat the other side's total result. Rolls are usually opposed (both sides roll).

There is absolutely no distinction made between the formal game aspects of an inborn talent or ability (e.g. “strength” or “intelligence”), a learned skill, academic knowledge, super-abilities, powers, magic, psionics, gadgets, vehicles, weapons, or even a character concept that summarizes many skills and advantages, such as “Ninja Training,” “Martial Arts” or “Shamanic Magic” (examples taken from the Quickstart Preview PDF). All such aspects of a character are named Traits and follow the same rules.

In the internal rules jargon of the game, a Trait is typically defined by a single noun or adjective (“Tough,” “Vicious,” “Athletic,” “Super-Strength,” “Bouncing,” “Gun-Fu,” etc.), or an adjective-noun combination (“Vicious Warrior,” “Magical Wards,” “Revealing Costume”), a compound noun (“Coup Staff,” “Body Armor”), a verb-noun combination (“Drink Blood”), a detailed phrase (“Able to Find Out Anybody’s Weakness“), or even an entire sentence (“Everyone Else Is Moving In Slow Motion”). All of this is only done for flavor and changes nothing in the task resolution.

There is also no obvious mechanical difference between Traits used for attacking and those used for defending. In the Quickstart Preview, for example, one of the characters listed can freely use “Mammoth Size” both as an offensive and defensive Trait. The same goes for Traits like “Deceptively Competent in Combat,” “Ninja Training,” “Athletic,” “Shamanic Magic,” or even “Vicious.”

There is also nothing wrong with a character, both a player-character or non-player character, possessing two or more Traits with very similar names or concepts, or even two of the same: The Quickstart Preview mentions a gunfighter hero with a first “.45 Caliber Hand Cannon” and a second “.45 Caliber Hand Cannon” as two of their Traits, not “Two .45 Guns” or “Double Gun Fighting,” for example. Another character in the PDF has both “Ninja Training” and “Athletic,” while yet another has both “Bounce Attack” and “Bouncing,” each listed as a separate Trait. The advantages of that become apparent once the player knows the mechanics for “Linking” and “Usages,” both defining concepts in playing CC&VF.

 Novelties 

 Usage of a Trait 
One of the more salient features of CC&VF is that it emphasizes the use of any and all game stats as limited resources. The core resolution mechanic is built on the idea that a comicbook character uses a specific ability, arising from one of their Traits, once per scene of a story, with the Trait becoming temporarily useless or ineffective after that use. This “ineffectiveness” mostly takes the following form: If a Trait was already used once in the scene, using it again for any purpose whatsoever requires the player rolling 2d12 and taking the lower (worse) result of the two. This becomes a worst-of-three roll if another Usage is taken, then worst-of-four, worst-of-five, and so forth. Consequently, if a character does not manage to solve or complete a task after having used one of their Traits, they are strongly advised to use another Trait, not the first Trait repeatedly, while it is still the same scene. Traits however will “refresh” or “re-fill” completely once the characters are in a new scene.

Using up the effectiveness of Traits that way can be interpreted in many different ways, depending on the Trait itself: firing all of one's ammunition, burning up energy, fuel, magical power, electricity, mental endurance or confidence, decreasing the character's calm, faith, concentration, “chi” or whatever. The only thing in the game that “saves” a Trait from becoming less effective after one usage is the Trait possessing a bonus feature that explicitly allows using that Trait several times in the same scene. While no rules for building your own Traits were given in the Quickstart Preview, the Core Rulebook explained this as a feature requiring a specific number of points in character creation. This is called a Signature. Players can buy up to two levels of "Signature" per Trait. Three usages per scene are the absolute ceiling before a player must switch to another Trait or start taking Detriment Dice. In the game stats for the characters, some of the Traits can be used with the same default power, or likelihood of success, of 1d12 twice or three times in the same scene, while others move either up or down in terms of power: It is possible to have a Trait that will start out using a best-of-three roll with 3d12, then using only the better of 2d12 on the second usage, and a single d12 on the third. The reverse is also possible: a single d12 for the first usage, the better of two d12 results for the second one, and best of three for the third, representing a character that gets increasingly powerful or skillful over a short period of time. The Core Rulebook establishes these bonuses as so-called Regulated Signatures, Diminishing Signatures, and Power-Up Signatures accordingly. All can be taken as one or two levels, but only one type of Signature is allowed per Trait (i.e. the player must decide whether he wants it to be Regulated, Diminishing, or Power-Up).

 Setback Tokens 
Upon failing to beat an opponent's total, characters in CC&VF take so-called Setback Tokens. They are an abstract form of damage or harm, or simply putting the character at a disadvantage. They do not in any way alter or affect game stats, though (no spiraling downward, no penalties to stat values). A player-character superhero is declared Out Of Commission and unable to act further when receiving their fourth consecutive Setback Token, while some villains or monsters can be defeated with only two such tokens. The game uses no further stat for the purpose of expressing damage, injury, stunning, or exhaustion. This is another feature it took directly from CAH: Season 2. Setback Tokens are immediately removed from the character(s) at the conclusion of a scene, for both the winning and the losing side.

 Linking 
Another decisive novelty is the CC&VF form of Traits with Links. As a game term, a “Link” differs very much from the Restriction named “Linked” in CAH: Season 2. In the latter game, the term “Linked” meant that a Trait that was marked by it could only be utilized in conjunction with another Trait (like a spell that would only be activated if the character used a magic wand), whereas in CC&VF, “Link” is an entirely positive modifier that enables the player to have their character use one Trait with another Trait boosting it, the “Linked” Trait giving it a fixed bonus number (+1 for Human-tier Traits, +3 for Superhuman-tier Traits, and +5 for Cosmic-tier Traits). CAH: Season 2 uses a similar modifier called “Enhancer,” but it states that a Trait can only ever profit from one Enhancer, never several Traits with the Enhancer bonus at the same time. This is precisely what Links do in CC&VF. If a character has more than one Trait with the “Link” modifier, any and all of the “Links” can be added together (the Link bonuses, never the base values). This form of stacking Traits on top of one another makes for a way to get an extremely high modifier to your d12 roll, increasing your chances to meet or beat a target number. However, since the “Usages” rule is always in effect, every time a Trait is linked, it counts as being used once, with the base Trait being boosted also counting as used. So, if a character has stacked six Traits, one primary Trait with five Links added, all six Traits would be marked as used once. This can quickly deplete the character's available Usages. This rule ensures that players have to be careful with their resources, knowing that failing with a heavily linked roll will make them susceptible to further attacks in that scene. It also clearly encourages burning up the “big” Traits that come with repeated Usages, and also encourages the Editor stacking Traits of the bad guys for formidable attacks and special actions.

How and when Traits are linked is definitely open to interpretation. The Quickstart Preview only says that “Linked Traits should make sense in how they are Linked together. The Editor has the final say on whether the Links are applicable” (CC&VF Quickstart, pg. 4).

Some examples for linking, taken from monsters and characters in the Quickstart Preview, are given here, with the primary Trait (the one being linked to) in block capitals, the Links listed after the plus sign:

SUPER-STRENGTH + Flight + Martial Arts
DRINK BLOOD + Vicious
TOUGH + Vicious Warrior
DECEPTIVELY COMPETENT + Very Smart
LATERAL THINKER + Ninja Training
SUPER-SPEED + Bouncing

Apart from giving the game an element of more detailed resource management, Linking effectively makes CC&VF one of the very few superhero games that make it very easy for characters to use several powers, skills, and tricks simultaneously (but every time they do so, they do it at a price or take a risk). Linking one's Traits is also the game's method to encourage crazy and flavorful “power stunts” or “super feats” without having a previous definition for those.

 Complications CC&VF uses genre-appropriate character flaws and weaknesses, essentially the same as Cartoon Action Hour's “Subplots,” under the name of “Complications.” The pre-gen heroes and villains all come with at least one Complication each. For characters in the Core Rulebook, it is not uncommon to have 3 or 4 Complications. Complications can be used to trigger inconveniences that in turn give a hero an extra point of Editorial Control to use later. Unlike other games, CC&VF does not have layers or stages of Complications or disadvantages: all Complications work the same way. Also, they do not affect the character's point total.

 Art by Bill Williams 
Both the Quickstart Preview and the Core Rulebook contain pieces of comic artwork by artist Bill Williams. They were used courtesy of the artist for promotional purposes. The art is actually unrelated to the game as such, and all the pieces chosen are pages or panels from Williams' free online comic Sidechicks, published through the website GraphicSmash.com.

 Other art 
The Core Rulebook also features numerous full-color character illustrations by Brent Sprecher, Scott Brewer, Tom Martin, and Derek Hand, all in a deliberate "superhero realism" style (as opposed to a cartoon or manga type style). The cover was done by Brent Sprecher and depicts many heroes and villains created by him before the creation of the game. Most of these characters appear as fully fleshed out, playable heroes and villains in the book, also (including Americana, Breaker, Deathstalker, Lillith, Moon Girl, and Vector).

 Reception 
Within days of its original PDF release in August 2012, CC&VF had become the fastest and best selling rulebook product for its publisher Spectrum Games. It soon garnered excellent and enthusiastic reviews on DriveThruRPG and RPG.net, many of them giving the game 4 out of 5 stars and even 5 out of 5 stars.

The success and fan support of the game was a big factor in the decision by Spectrum Games, formerly a one-person company, to bring in Stephen Sheperd, Barak Blackburn, and Norbert Franz as permanent employees and staff writers. As a quartet, the company wants to ensure that there can be continued and timely support for all their game lines.

Spectrum Games's first ever Kickstarter campaign, started in October 2012, is also for a book for the CC&VF line, a large villains gallery supplement including all new art, plot hooks, and adventures.

 Name similarities Capes, Cowls and Villains Foul is not to be confused with, nor affiliated with, any of the following similarly named products and publications:

• Capes'', a comicbook mini-series in three issues, written by Robert Kirkman.

• Capes, a narrative independent roleplaying game published in 2005 by Muse of Fire Games.

• Capes & Cowls: Adventures in Wyrd City, a board game published in 2006 by Wyrd House.

• Villains and Vigilantes, a roleplaying game originally published in 1979 by Fantasy Games Unlimited.

External links 
 Spectrum Games homepage
 Capes, Cowls and Villains Foul homepage
 CC&VF Quickstart Preview and Other Free Downloads
 CC&VF design blog by Barak Blackburn
 Bill Williams' Sidechicks comic

Superhero role-playing games
Role-playing games introduced in 2010